Neil Chester Vipond (December 24, 1929 – July 15, 2022) was an American-based Canadian actor and stage director.

Life and career
Neil Vipond, the son of a salesman and a former performer on the vaudeville circuit, was born and grew up in Toronto. He started his acting career with the International Players in Kingston, Ontario in 1951. Two years later he appeared at the Stratford Shakespearean Festival, and stayed there for five seasons. He spent much of his adult life in New York and Toronto, but in the early 1990s, he moved to Los Angeles. He died on July 15, 2022, aged 92, at his home in Quakertown, Pennsylvania.

Filmography

References

External links 

 
 

1929 births
2022 deaths
Canadian male film actors
Canadian male television actors
Male actors from Toronto
Canadian emigrants to the United States
20th-century Canadian male actors